Keanae is an unincorporated community in Maui County on the island of Maui in the U.S. state of Hawaii.
Keanae is a peninsula known best for being one of Hawaii's major taro farm growing regions.
Keanae shares the zip code of 96708 with Haikū. The peninsula was originally made from lava. This lava originated from Haleakala Crater. The area currently attracts photographers and fisherman from all around the world. Although Keanae is known for its scenic peninsula, it is dangerous to swim along the shore due to its sharp lava rocks.

Near Keanae is an old, stone church. This church was built in 1856 and is one of a few buildings left after the tsunami in 1946. Twenty four people were killed in the tsunami.

Education

Hawaii Department of Education (HIDOE) operates area public schools, with students attending Hana High and Elementary School in Hana.

Ke'anae School, which had grades Kindergarten through 3 in 2005, formerly served the community. In the 2000s the average enrollment was five and enrollment in 2005 was three. In the latter year there were 15 students going to Hana, which already handled grades 4 through 12 for Keanae residents. In 2005 there were HIDOE sent the remaining Keanae students to Hana School to conserve resources as Kaenae School's enrollment fell to three; classes were not held at Ke'anae School since and in 2010 HIDOE formally closed the school.

In 2010 there was a proposal for a charter school to serve Ke'anae.

References

Unincorporated communities in Maui County, Hawaii
Populated places on Maui
Unincorporated communities in Hawaii